Norway 1985 is a computer wargame published in October 1985 by Strategic Simulations. Developed by Roger Keating, it was the fourth in the "When Superpowers Collide" series.

Summary
The game simulates NATO forces in Norway during the summer of 1985. The player may choose to play either the NATO or Soviet forces, and can play in turns against another human component or against the computer.

Reception
Computer Gaming World in 1986 stated that Norway 1985s simplified rules compared to its predecessors accurately reflected the changes of arctic combat, and made it the most suitable for those new to the series. The magazine concluded that although those familiar with the older games "will have to adjust your expectations ... If you can do this, you will find a good game here".

Reviews
The V.I.P. of Gaming Magazine #5 (Sept./Oct., 1986)

See also
Germany 1985
RDF 1985
Baltic 1985: Corridor to Berlin

References

External links

Images of Norway 1985 box and manual from C64Sets.com

1985 video games
Alternate history video games
Apple II games
Cold War video games
Commodore 64 games
Computer wargames
Multiplayer and single-player video games
Strategic Simulations games
Video games developed in Australia
Video games set in Norway